Two bombings on 5 September 2018 at the Maiwand Wrestling Club in Qala-e-Nazer in Dasht-e-Barchi, a predominantly Hazara neighborhood of western Kabul, left at least 20 people dead and 70 others wounded, the deadliest attack on Kabul's Shia since the 15 August suicide bombing. The responsibility for the attacks was claimed by ISIL.

Attacks
In the first attack a suicide bomber detonated his explosive vest around 6 p.m. local time at the Maiwand Wrestling Club. The second explosion took place when a car packed with explosives was detonated by the time emergency services, journalists and police had gathered at the scene.

The witnesses said on social media that the attacker killed the club guards before blowing himself up inside the club.

Casualties
The toll were initially reported to be 20 killed and 70 injured but a later report by the deputy spokesman for the Ministry of Interior of Afghanistan said that the casualties had increased to 26 dead and 91 injured. Tolo News, a private broadcaster, said two of its "best journalists", Samim Faramarz, 28 and Ramiz Ahmadi, 23 were killed in the second attack  and NAI said at least four other journalists were among the wounded people also in the second attack. Hashmat Stanekzai, the Kabul police spokesman, said the second explosion came when police were helping victims and as a result some of officers were wounded.

See also
List of terrorist incidents in September 2018
September 2016 Kabul attacks
List of terrorist attacks in Kabul

References

2018 murders in Afghanistan
Terrorist incidents in Kabul
Suicide bombings in 2018
Terrorist incidents in Afghanistan in 2018
Massacres of Hazara people
Persecution of Hazaras
Targeted killing in Afghanistan
Suicide bombings in Afghanistan
Mass murder in 2018
Mass murder in Kabul
Mass murder in Afghanistan
September 2018 crimes in Asia
2018 in Kabul
Military operations of the War in Afghanistan (2001–2021)
Attacks on buildings and structures in Afghanistan
ISIL terrorist incidents in Afghanistan
Building bombings in Afghanistan
Attacks in Afghanistan in 2018